Nepal-PQ1 also known as SanoSat-1 is Nepal's first PocketQube picosatellite developed by ORION Space that was launched on January 13, 2022, from Falcon 9. The primary function of the satellite is to collect wind, temperature, and humidity data and communicate findings with ground stations in Nepal

Background 
The PocketQube is developed by ORION Space in collaboration with AMSAT-Nepal and AMSAT-EA,
with the brokerage service offered by FOSSA Systems, a leading aerospace company
focused on developing picosatellites for IoT communications.
SanoSat-1 is a PocketQube of 1P size designed and developed with readily available
commercial components (COTS) to measure space radiation while orbiting,
and periodically transmit it to Earth. The satellite will act as a digital repeater in
an amateur band. The store and forward concept can be used in remote disaster-prone
locations. The same concept can also be used to collect data from ground-based
sensors, store it on board, and transmit it to Earth's main station.
The picosatellite has successfully passed all Environmental Testing Campaigns and is
on its way to Cape Canaveral (Florida, USA), where it will be launched with SpaceX's
Falcon 9 vehicle. The satellite has a mass of 250 grams.

Specifications 
Section Source

SANOSAT-1 
 Country: Nepal
 Type: PocketQube
 Organisation: ORION Space

See also 
NepaliSat-1

References

External links  
 Official website
 Saurav Paudel talking about SANOSAT-1

CubeSats
Picosatellites
Satellites of Nepal
2022 in Nepal
Spacecraft launched in 2022